The University of Central Oklahoma (UCO or Central State) is a public university in Edmond, Oklahoma. It is the third largest university in Oklahoma, with more than 17,000 students and approximately 434 full-time and 400 adjunct faculty. Founded in 1890, the University of Central Oklahoma was one of the first institutions of higher learning to be established in what would become the state of Oklahoma, making it one of the oldest universities in the southwest region of the United States. It is home to the American branch of the British Academy of Contemporary Music in downtown Oklahoma City.

History
The University of Central Oklahoma was founded on December 24, 1890, when the Territorial Legislature voted to establish the Territorial Normal School, making UCO the second oldest public institution in Oklahoma. First being the University of Oklahoma established December 19, 1890.  Classes were first held in November 1891.  By comparison, Oklahoma A&M College (now Oklahoma State University) held its first classes in December 1891 and the University of Oklahoma began its first classes in fall 1892.

The Territorial Legislature located the new school in Edmond, provided certain conditions were met. First, Oklahoma County had to donate $5,000 in bonds, and Edmond had to donate  of land within one mile (1.6 km) of the town; the land was eventually donated by Anton Classen. Ten of those acres had to be set aside for the new school. The remaining land had to be divided into lots which would be sold to raise money for the new school. On October 1, 1891 Richard Thatcher was elected the 1st President of Territorial Normal School of Oklahoma.

The conditions all were met, with the city of Edmond donating an additional $2,000 in bonds. The first class, a group of 23 students, met for the first time November 1, 1891, in the Epworth League Room, located in the unfurnished First Methodist Church. A marker of Oklahoma granite was placed in 1915 near the original site by the Central Oklahoma Normal School Historical Society. It can be seen at Boulevard and Second Street.

Old North was the first building constructed in the summer of 1892 on the campus of what was then Territorial Normal School.  It was also the first building constructed in Oklahoma Territory for the purpose of higher education. Occupancy began January 3, 1893. The school first operated as a normal school with two years of college work and a complete preparatory school. In 1897, the first graduating class—two men and three women—received their Normal School diplomas.

In 1904, Territorial Normal became Central State Normal School. Statehood was still three years away. On December 29, 1919, the State Board of Education passed a resolution making Central a four-year teachers’ college conferring bachelor's degrees. From 1901 until 1961, Central housed a laboratory school in which local elementary schoolchildren were schooled by Central's faculty and soon-to-be teaching graduates.

Two years later, the Class of 1921 had nine members, the first graduates to receive the four-year degrees. Two decades later, in 1939, the Oklahoma Legislature authorized the institution to grant both Bachelor of Arts and Bachelor of Science degrees. With the expanded offerings came a new name, Central State College.

According to the Encyclopedia of Oklahoma History and Culture, the school was routinely affected by state politics. Presidents and sometimes faculty members, were changed with changes in state governors. In 1950, President Max W. Chambers banned solicitations of campaign donations from faculty members. This resulted in more stability of the school administration.

On March 11, 1941, Central State became part of a coordinated state system of post-secondary education overseen by the Oklahoma Regents for Higher Education, and joined institutions with similar missions as a regional institution.

In 1954, the Oklahoma State Regents for Higher Education gave Central permission to offer the Master of Teaching Degree, which became the Master of Education in 1969. In 1971, the college was authorized to grant the Master of Arts in English and the Master of Business Administration degrees.

On April 13, 1971, the state legislature officially changed the institution's name to Central State University. Old North Tower was placed on the National Register of Historic Places in 1971.
On May 18, 1990, during the university's Centennial Year, legislation was passed changing the name to the University of Central Oklahoma, though many of the students still refer to the University as "Central", and many alumni as "Central State."

Presidents

Since 1891, the University of Central Oklahoma has had 20 presidents and two acting presidents.

 Richard Thatcher (1891–1893)
 George W. Winans (1893–1894)
 E.R. Williams (1894–1895)
 Edmund D. Murdaugh (1895–1901)
 Frederick H. Umholtz (1901–1906)
 Thomas W. Butcher (1906–1908)
 James A. McLaughlin (1908–1911)
 Charles Evans (1911–1916)
 Grant B. Grumbine (1916–1917)
 James W. Graves (1917–1919)
 John G. Michell (1919–1931)
 Malcom A. Beeson (1931–1935)
 Cliff R. Otto, Acting (1935)
 John O. Moseley (1935–1939)
 Roscoe R. Robinson (1939–1948
 George P. Huckaby, Acting (1948)
 W. Max Chambers (1949–1960)
 Garland Godfrey (1960–1975)
 Bill J. Lillard (1975–1992)
 George Nigh (1992–1997)
 W. Roger Webb (1997–June 30, 2011)
 Don Betz (August 1, 2011 – June 30, 2019)
 Patti Neuhold-Ravikumar (July 1, 2019–present)

Academics

The University of Central Oklahoma School of Music Jazz Division is the largest in the state and one of the largest in the region.

Schools and colleges
UCO is composed of seven schools and colleges:

 College of Fine Arts & Design
 College of Business
 College of Liberal Arts

 College of Education and Professional Studies
 College of Mathematics and Science
 Forensic Science Institute
 Jackson College of Graduate Studies

UCO Jazz Lab
The UCO Jazz Lab is home for the celebrated Jazz Studies Division of the University of Central Oklahoma School of Music. The Jazz Program was started in 1974 by Dr. Kent Kidwell. Since 1974, the Jazz program grew to what it is today.

The UCO Jazz Lab is located on the corner of 5th and Littler St. in Edmond, Oklahoma. The Jazz Lab was built in 2001. It was built with a stage, classrooms, Hideaway Pizza and the Jazz Lab Recording Studio. Students utilize the Jazz Lab on a daily basis. The UCO Jazz Studies Division offers numerous performance ensembles which include:
 Jazz Ensembles I, II, III, & IV
 Undergraduate Combos'
 Graduate Combos'
 Latin Jazz Ensemble
 The Jazz Guitar Ensemble I & II

The School of Music currently offers an undergraduate Minor in Jazz Studies and a Master of Music in Jazz Studies with Majors either in Performance or Commercial Music Production. The UCO Jazz Lab also hosts the annual Recording Technology Workshop and the annual Guitar Techniques Workshop during the summer. The UCO Jazz Ensembles have received many awards. In 2008, The UCO Jazz Ensemble I revived the  "Outstanding University Jazz Ensemble" award at the 2006 and 2008 UNT Jazz Festival. In 1983 UCO's Dixieland band was ranked No.1 in the nation and in 1975, UCO Jazz Ensemble I received top honors at the Wichita Jazz Festival and since then, all UCO Jazz Bands have participated in the event.

Since it opened, The Jazz Lab has won "Best Place for Live Music" multiple times in the Edmond Life & Leisure's Reader's Choice annual poll, and has been repeatedly won the award for The Best Live Music Venue in the Oklahoma Gazette’s Best of OKC readers’ poll. The Jazz Lab has featured many famous performers including:

 Wynton Marsalis
 Kenny Garrett
 George Winston
 Chris Botti
 Kenny Werner
 Christopher Cross
 United States Army Jazz Ambassadors
 David Gibson
 Ann Hampton Callaway
 Steve Tyrell
 Miguel Zenon
 Diane Shuur

 Pat Metheny
 Lynn Seaton
 Jane Monheit
 John Pizzarelli
 Boz Scaggs
 Peter Krauss
 Maynard Ferguson
 Leon Russell
 Phil Woods
 Chick Corea
 Tierney Sutton

In addition to featuring some of the biggest names in jazz, The UCO Jazz Lab features local and regional musicians from various genres every Thursday, Friday and Saturday nights.

UCentral Student Media
UCentral is the student media network at the University of Central Oklahoma, featuring traditional media (television, radio, newspaper) and new media (web, netcasts, social networking) created by students majoring in professional media.

UCentral television programming is available online at ucentralmedia.com and in the city of Edmond, Oklahoma on Cox Cable digital channel 125.

The Vista newspaper, founded in 1903, is distributed free of charge on the UCO campus and designated off-campus locations and also available online at ucentralmedia.com.

The student radio station, UCentral Radio 99.3 FM was awarded an LPFM license by the FCC on September 24, 2015. The station's official call letters are KZUC-LP.

Campus

Academic buildings

 The Art and Design Building
 Max Chambers Library
 Communications Building
 Center For Transformative Learning
 Education Building
 Evans Hall
 Health and Physical Education Building
 Math and Computer Science Building
 Coyner Health Sciences Building 
 Human Environmental Science Building
 Howell Hall
 Laboratory Annex
 Liberal Arts North Building
 Liberal Arts South Building
 Mitchell Hall Theatre
 Business Building
 Music Building
 Thatcher Hall
 Wantland Hall
 W. Roger Webb Forensic Science Institute
 Old North

Other campus buildings
 Chad Richison Stadium
 Lillard Administration Building
 Bausher Place
 Nigh University Center
 Housing Office
 Ropes Course
 University Commons Clubhouse
 Department of Public Safety
 University House
 Hamilton Field House
 Central Plant
 Wellness Center
 Physical Plant
 Y-Chapel of Song

Residential buildings
UCO has five residence halls on campus.
 Murdaugh Hall - traditional-style co-ed residence hall; houses up to 290 students.
 West Hall - traditional-style co-ed residence hall; can house up to 452 students.
 The University Suites - co-ed suite-style residence hall; houses up to 302 students and contains a computer lab and dining facility.
 University Commons apartments - consists of multiple apartment buildings, which include two-bedroom and four-bedroom apartments. The Commons Clubhouse is a  community building with a TV lounge, computer lab, and recreation room.
Transformative Learning Quadrangle or "The Quad" - co-ed pod style residence hall; houses up to 440 students and contains several classrooms, a dining facility, fitness room, and laundry room.

Off-campus buildings
 UCO Jazz Lab
 Outdoor Adventure Recreation Center (Lake Arcadia)
 Small Business Development Center (Downtown OKC)
 The Academy of Contemporary Music (Bricktown)
 Selman Living Laboratory (Freedom, Oklahoma)
CHK|Central Boathouse (Oklahoma River OKC)
UCO Downtown (Downtown OKC)

Athletics

UCO participates in intercollegiate athletics in the NCAA at the Division II level and is a member of the Mid-America Intercollegiate Athletics Association (MIAA). The university joined the MIAA in 2012; prior to joining the conference, UCO was a member of the Lone Star Conference and was the largest school in the conference. In 2010, it applied to join the MIAA. On July 30, 2010, the conference approved its application to join the conference beginning in the 2012-2013 academic year. Both men's and women's teams are nicknamed the Bronchos. UCO currently competes in baseball, men's and women's basketball, women's cross-country and track and field, football, men's and women's golf, women's soccer, softball, women's tennis, volleyball, wrestling, and women's rowing. Their women's rowing team has been very successful in the past few years, winning back-to-back NCAA DII Rowing Championships (2018-2019).

Greek life
UCO is home to 28 Greek organizations.

 IFC Chapters:
 Acacia
 Alpha Tau Omega
 Pi Kappa Alpha
 Sigma Alpha Epsilon
 Sigma Nu
 Sigma Tau Gamma
 Panhellenic Chapters:
 Alpha Delta Pi
 Alpha Gamma Delta
 Alpha Xi Delta
 Delta Zeta
 Sigma Kappa
 Sigma Sigma Sigma

 National Pan-Hellenic Chapters:
 Alpha Kappa Alpha
 Alpha Phi Alpha
 Delta Sigma Theta
 Kappa Alpha Psi
 Omega Psi Phi
 Phi Beta Sigma
 Sigma Gamma Rho
 Zeta Phi Beta
 Multicultural Greek Council:
Kappa Delta Chi
Omega Delta Phi
 Sigma Lambda Gamma
 Christian Greek Chapters:
 Beta Sigma Chi
 Beta Upsilon Chi
 Sigma Phi Lambda
 Professional Fraternity Association
 Kappa Kappa Psi
 Phi Mu Alpha Sinfonia (in colonial process)

Notable alumni and faculty

References

External links

 
 Central Oklahoma Athletics website
 

 
University of Central Oklahoma
University of Central Oklahoma
Educational institutions established in 1890
Buildings and structures in Oklahoma County, Oklahoma
1890 establishments in Oklahoma Territory